Maritza M. Buendía (born 1974) is a narrator and essayist from Zacatecas, México. She studied Degree in Humanities and Letters. She also studied at the Universidad Autónoma Metropolitana (UAM) and the Autonomous University of Zacatecas (UAZ). Between their more important works there are the books En el jardín de los cautivos, Vouyeur, poética del amor that made her gain several awards. She won the National Young Story Prize Julio Torri and the National Essay Prize Jose Revueltas 2011.

Biography

School
Maritza M. Buendía studied the masters in philosophy and history of the ideas, at UAZ and studied the doctorate in literary theory at UAM. When she was studying her interest in writing works arose, and began to write her first book. During her studies she was scholarship holder of the State Bottom for the Culture and Arts (1997–1998, essays; 2002–2003, story). In addition she was scholarship holder of the first generation of the Mexican Literature Foundation in the narrative area (2003–2004) and scholarship holder of the National Bottom for the Culture and the Arts in the area of creative young people (2007–2008).

Achievements
Her first essay was written in 1998  called Isla de sombras that is an approach to the life and the work of Roberto Cabral del Hoyo.The effort and dedication of Maritza made possible that in  2004 gained the National Young Story Prize Julio Torri with the book En el jardín de los cautivos. The success of the book was so great that her work was translated into Dutch and English. Time later the writer made another book that was called La memoria del agua and also was a full success for the writer. Also she has been educational-investigator in the academic unit of letters of UAM, and publisher of the magazine Runs, Rabbit. In addition she has collaborated in the magazines Diálogo, Dosfilos, Oficio, and Tierra Adentro.

Also Maritza participated in the collective books of Young story anthology, UNAM, 2004; and Ramón López Velarde the intelligent exercise of the passion,  CONACULTA, Tierra Adentro 2001

2011 for Maritza M. Buendía
In 2011 the Instituto de Cultura del Estado de Durango (ICED) through the house of culture in Gómez Palacio, announced the name of Maritza M. Buendía like the unquestionable  winner of the National essay prize José Revueltas 2011, with her work  Poética de Vouyeur, poetry of love.

Vouyeur, poetry of love
This essay is product of several investigations by Maritza M. Buendía to the authors Juan García Ponce and Inés Arredondo for many years. She investigates three tales of each one. For this literally work the author achieved the Premio Nacional de Ensayo José Revueltas 2011.  Maritza explained to the magazine Dosfilos in an interview that her interest in literature includes more than one area and her development allow teaching. Also explained that is pleasant to know that other people recognize your work as well as explained how complicated is to find a publisher that publish and accept their work for writers.

Features of her works
Generally her works create erotic tension and incite the reader's curiosity. Her books can vary narrator, they can be in first person or omniscient. Maritza commented that her experience during the foundation of these books is the tenacity, euphoria, prostration and teaching.

Currently
Currently Maritza is writing two books focused in the history of a woman and a man but the plot of the two books is addressed in different ways. She said this in her blog6  she made it for the web page Fundación para las letras Mexicanas. Maritza is still living in Zacatecas and teaches at the Literature Faculty of Autonomous University of Zacatecas.

Gallery

See also
Zacatecas
Universidad Autónoma Metropolitana
Autonomous University of Zacatecas
Roberto Cabral del Hoyo

References
http://www.fundacionletrasmexicanas.org/index.php?option=com_content&task=view&id=280&Itemid=332
http://enescritoresjovenes.com.mx/index.php?option=com_content&view=article&id=86:maritza-m-buendia-&catid=44:invitados&Itemid=71
http://teecuento.wordpress.com/2011/10/10/quiza-te-extrane-de-maritza-buendia/
BUENDÍA, Maritza M. En el jardín de los cautivos, Saltillo, Coahuila, CNCA/Instituto Coahuilense de la Cultura/Fondo Editorial Tierra Adentro, 2005. 102

1974 births
Living people
Mexican essayists
Mexican women writers
People from Zacatecas
Mexican women essayists